The Tornado outbreak of February 13–14, 2000 was a tornado outbreak that occurred between February 13 and February 14. Three deadly tornadoes raked several counties of southwest Georgia (USA), killing 18 and causing extensive damage to neighborhoods on the south edge of Camilla, where eleven died, as well as the area north of Meigs, where six died.  It was the single deadliest tornado outbreak in the United States between June 1999 and October 2002. Other tornadoes struck Arkansas, Alabama, Tennessee, Florida and the Carolinas during the 12-hour outbreak.

Tornado table

Confirmed tornadoes

February 13 event

February 14 event

See also 
List of tornadoes and tornado outbreaks
List of North American tornadoes and tornado outbreaks

References

External links 

Storm summary and damage report (National Weather Service at Tallahassee)

F3 tornadoes
Tornadoes of 2000
Tornadoes in Georgia (U.S. state)
Southwest Georgia Tornado Outbreak, 2000
2000 in Georgia (U.S. state)
February 2000 events in the United States